Bishop Gerald Almeida (born March 7, 1946) is the current Roman Catholic Bishop of Jabalpur, Madhya Pradesh, India since 2001. At age seventy-five, he is expected to retire as Bishop.

Early life
Bishop Gerald Almeida was born on March 7, 1946, at Udyavar a small town near Mangalore. He was ordained a priest in 1974.

References

1946 births
Living people
People from Udupi district
21st-century Roman Catholic bishops in India